First Transit operates several bus systems in the Southern Tier region of New York under contract. Many of these systems are medium-sized bus systems, operating within certain city, village, or county borders. With the exception of CTran Elmira (which runs daily), all systems operate Monday through Saturday

Services 

CTran operates as a regional public transportation provider for the citizens and visitors of the City of Elmira, New York and its surrounding area.  Previously known as the Chemung County Transportation System (CCTS), Chemung County adopted the name change to CTran in 2012. Most of the CTran routes operate once hourly throughout the day on weekdays, with limited service on Saturdays and Sundays. Operation of the system is managed by contract with First Transit, Inc., the same agency that also operates the Corning-Erwin Area Transit System (CEATS) and the Steuben County Transit System.

The majority of routes connect at a transfer center located on Railroad Avenue in Elmira.

List of CTran Routes

  Southside Loop (evening and Sunday route)
  Wellsburg - Waverly
  Pine City
  Elmira - Corning Community College
  Spencer - Van Etten

Special regional routes
Limited service hours on these routes
  Schuyler County (Watkins Glen to Cornell University, Ithaca)
  Chemung County - Route 1 (Route 13 to Cornell University, Ithaca)

Corning-Erwin Area Transit System
  Northside
  Southside
  Cooper Plains / Gang Mills / Painted Post
  Corning Community College
  East Corning / Gibson
  Corning Museum of Glass Shuttle

Steuben County Transit System
  Village of Bath
  Hammondsport
  Bath - Corning

See also

Local municipalities 

  Chemung County
  Elmira, New York
  Horseheads, New York
  Corning, New York

Neighboring transit agencies 

  Tompkins Consolidated Area Transit
  Broome County Transit

References

External links
  Corning-Erwin Area Transit System
  Steuben County Transit System
  Hornell Area Transit
  Tompkins Consolidated Area Transit
  Broome County Transit
  Chemung County Transportation Guide

Bus transportation in New York (state)
Transportation in Chemung County, New York